Death of an Outsider is the third mystery novel in the Hamish Macbeth series by Marion Chesney under her pseudonym M. C. Beaton.  It was first published in 1988.

Plot introduction
While Hamish Macbeth is on duty temporarily in Cnothan, William Mainwaring, the most disliked man in town is murdered.  No one wants to solve the crime, including Macbeth's superiors who want to keep the strange manner of Mainwaring's death hushed up.

External links 
 UK publisher Constable & Robinson

Footnotes

1988 British novels
British detective novels
British mystery novels
Hamish Macbeth series
Novels set in Highland (council area)
St. Martin's Press books